Kuy-e Behrooz (also Romanized as Kūy-e Behrooz) is a village in Chahardangeh Rural District, Chaharbagh District, Savojbolagh County, Alborz Province, Iran. At the 2006 census, its population was 52, in 16 families.

References 

Populated places in Savojbolagh County